Khabikki Lake is a salt water lake, in the Soan Sakaser Valley in the southern Salt Range area in Khushab District, Punjab,  Pakistan. This lake is formed due to the absence of drainage in the range. It is part of Uchhali Wetlands Complex and has been designated a Ramsar site.

The lake is one kilometer wide and two kilometres long. A hill gently ascends on the right side of the lake.

Khabikki is also the name of a neighboring village. Boats are available, and there are two places to stay. A full fledged recreational resort has been established by TDCP with all necessary facilities and quick access to the resort from the main road.

See also
Uchhali Lake
Soan Sakaser Valley

References 

Lakes of Punjab (Pakistan)
Khushab District